Dhaneti  or Dhanetee is a village in Bhuj Taluka of Kutch District of Gujarat State of India. It is at a distance of about 26 km from Bhuj the Taluka and district headquarters of Kutch. Although it is in Bhuj Taluka, the
Anjar Taluka headquarters of Anjar is only 18 km away.

History

About the history of Dhaneti, the village holds a special place in annals of Kutch Gurjar Kshatriyas or Mistris of Kutch, who entered Kutch and fought a battle on the land of the Dhaneti village in late 12th Century around 1177–78 A.D. (V.S. 1234) and got themselves established and settled at this village under leadership of Patel Ganga Maru.

Even today, intricate paliyas or memorial stones of their dadas or shurapuras (the ancestors who died while fighting) and deris (pyre alters) of their Satis are standing there near village pond and other areas of village, as a mute witness to the war that was fought on this land by these Gurjar Kshatriyas, who are known as Mistris of Kutch. Today almost a thousand years after the war, the community people visit Dhaneti to pay respect to these memorial stones, built in memory of their forefathers, who gave up their lives fighting to defend their next generations.

Later during 14th to 15th century Mistris in course of time left Dhaneti and went on to establish other eighteen villages in Kutch, which were granted to them by the king. They were master craftsmen and architects and have played major role in erection and construction of majority of forts, palaces and architect of Kutch. It was because of their this quality they came to be known as Mistris in Kutch.

Temples
The Patleshwar Mahadev Temple of Shiva is the oldest temple of village, located on sides of village pond. Beside which lies to temples of Shurapura of Mistris of Kutch. There is also temple of Ramdev Pir in village.

Present Status
At present, majority of people who live in this village are Ahir, Rabari and Goswami. Dhaneti today is famous for special Ahir & Rabari embroidery done by women of this community, and has developed as major center for this art and tourist attraction.

Ramakrishna Mission is running a School, Students Home and other activities in Dhaneti since 1992.

References

Villages in Kutch district
Populated places established in the 12th century
1177 establishments in Asia
12th-century establishments in India